Arteriolar vasodilators are substances or medications that preferentially dilate arterioles. When used on people with certain heart conditions, it causes a phenomenon known as the cardiac steal syndrome. Arteriolar vasodilators increase intracapillary pressure, which causes fluid to enter the tissues, leading to vasodilatory edema.

Arteriolar vasodilators include:
 hydralazine
 minoxidil
 nitroprusside

References 

Vasodilators